Benefitalign is a cloud-based SAAS company based in Albuquerque, NM, United States with offices in Dubai and India. Benefitalign was founded by Girish Panicker in 2012, and develops custom software products in the healthcare market. Its best known products include Stateengage, Healthplanengage and Brokerengage.

Company overview
Benefitalign is an American software company that primarily develops, licenses, supports and sells software and related services in the health care industry. Benefitalign also provides contact center services, CRM consulting and other services.

The company found early success through the rapid changes in the healthcare industry as a result of the Patient Protection and Affordable Care Act in 2010. PPACA was encouraging the health care industry to implement consumer friendly technologies with self-service models and Benefitalign’s cloud based solution complimented the new movement by allowing customers to quickly set-up and customize the new sales channels.

The Benefitalign platform is an enterprise system that provides a CRM based infrastructure to manage member data and provide extensibility across the enterprise, allowing the platform to be further developed if needed.

History
Benefitalign was initially launched in 2011 by Girish Panicker for health care software development and consultancy. It was specifically created under Speridian to focus on selling "Quote to Card" shopping and enrollment software to the healthcare market.

By 2013, the company connected nearly 1 million consumers to health plans in multiple states and supported several state exchanges.

In October 2013, Benefitalign launched three major health plans using the integrated Oracle Siebel and Benefitalign platform in Florida, Virginia and Arizona. AvMed Health Plans launched in Florida and initially served 300,000 people, Optima Health which provided coverage to over 450,000 people in Virginia and the University of Arizona’s Health Plans in Arizona which had 150,000 members.

References

Cloud applications
Companies based in Albuquerque, New Mexico
Companies established in 2011
2011 establishments in New Mexico